The south-western spiny-tailed gecko (Strophurus spinigerus), also known commonly as the soft spiny-tailed gecko, is a species of lizard in the family Diplodactylidae. The species is endemic to Australia. Two subspecies are recognized.

Geographic range
S. spinigerus is found in the southwestern part of the Australian state of Western Australia.

Habitat
The natural habitats of S. spinigerus are forest and shrubland.

Description
Dorsally, it is olive-grey, speckled with black. It may have a broad zigzag black stripe along the back. The spiny tubercles on the back and tail are black. Ventrally, it is dirty white, either uniform or speckled with black.

Reproduction
S. spinigerus is oviparous.

Subspecies
Two subspecies are recognized as being valid, including the nominotypical subspecies.
Strophurus spinigerus inornatus 
Strophurus spinigerus spinigerus 

Nota bene: A trinomial authority in parentheses indicates that the subspecies was originally described in a genus other than Strophurus.

References

Further reading
Cogger HG (2014). Reptiles and Amphibians of Australia, Seventh Edition. Clayton, Victoria, Australia: CSIRO Publishing. xxx + 1,033 pp. .
Gray JE (1842). "Description of some hitherto unrecorded species of Australian Reptiles and Batrachians". Zoological Miscellany 2: 51–57. (Diplodactylus spinigerus, new species, p. 53).
Laube A, Langner C (2007). "Die Gattung Strophurus [= The genus Strophurus]". Draco 8 (29): 49–66. (in German).
Rösler H (2000). "Kommentierte Liste der rezent, subrezent und fossil bekannten Geckotaxa (Reptilia: Gekkonomorpha) [= Annotated list of the recent, subrecent and fossil known Geckotaxa (Reptilia: Gekkonomorpha)]". Gekkota 2: 28–153. (Strophurus spinigerus, p. 115). (in German).
Storr GM (1988). "The subspecies of Diplodactylus spinigerus (Lacertilia: Gekkonidae)". Records of the Western Australian Museum 14 (2): 177–182. (Diplodactylus spinigerus inornatus, new subspecies, pp. 180–182, Figures 3 & 4).
Wilson, Steve; Swan, Gerry (2013). A Complete Guide to Reptiles of Australia, Fourth Edition. Sydney: New Holland Publishers. 522 pp. .

Strophurus
Geckos of Australia
Reptiles described in 1842
Taxa named by John Edward Gray